

See also 
 List of United States Supreme Court cases by the Roberts Court
 2019 term opinions of the Supreme Court of the United States

External links 

Lists of 2019 term United States Supreme Court opinions